Charity Anne Bick  (19 December 1924 – 22 April 2002) was a British civilian dispatch rider during the Second World War, and the youngest ever recipient of the George Medal, the United Kingdom's second-highest award for civilian bravery. She later served in the Women's Royal Air Force.

Biography
Charity Anne Bick was born on 19 December 1924 and educated at Lyng Primary School in Horton Street, Lyng, West Bromwich.

At the age of 14, while living in Maud Road, West Bromwich she lied about her age, claiming to be 16, to join the Air Raid Precautions (ARP) service in that town. She volunteered at the office of a brick works near her home, delivering messages between ARP depots, by bicycle. Her father was an ARP post warden.

During a 1940 air raid on West Bromwich, she helped her father to put out an incendiary bomb that had lodged in the roof of a shop. When the roof gave way, she fell through and suffered minor injuries. Nonetheless, she then used a borrowed bicycle and made numerous attempts to deliver a message to the control room, one and a quarter miles away, avoiding bombs and shrapnel. She made repeated trips, at least three of which occurred during the height of the raid.

In early 1941 Bick was informed that she had been awarded the George Medal (GM), for her bravery that night. The official citation, in The London Gazette of 14 February 1941, read:

Aged 16, she was the youngest person ever to receive the GM. The medal was presented to her by King George VI in a ceremony on 10 September 1941. She also received the Defence Medal and War Medal at the end of the war.

Bick went on to join the Women's Auxiliary Air Force, retiring in 1962 from its successor, the Women's Royal Air Force as a warrant officer, and having earned the Royal Air Force Long Service and Good Conduct Medal. Her service number was 2109222.

Final years and legacy
Later in her life, Bick lived in Inverness, Scotland. She died there on 22 April 2002, age 77. Her portrait, in oil, by Alfred Reginald Thomson, RA, is in the Imperial War Museum, London, while her medals are on display at the Imperial War Museum North. A blue plaque commemorating Bick was erected at Lyng Primary School, by the Lyng History Group, on 21 February 2002. The school was presented with a replica set of her medals in March 2002. Charity Bick Way in West Bromwich is named in her honour.

References

External links

 Audio recording of interview with Bick 
 

Recipients of the George Medal
1924 births
2002 deaths
People from West Bromwich
Women's Auxiliary Air Force airwomen
Year of birth uncertain
Civil Defence Service personnel